Marrying the Mafia II is a 2005 South Korean film and the sequel to Marrying the Mafia (2002). It was the most successful comedy film in South Korea the year of its release; its over 5 million tickets sold represented more than 10% of the population and contributed to the third straight year that more tickets were sold for local than for Hollywood films.

Plot
The oldest son of the White Tiger Gang is pressured by his family to settle down and get married; but when he finds the perfect girl, she turns out to be a state prosecutor for crimes of violence, specifically gangster related. The district attorney is a lookalike of the gangster's former fiancée who died getting hit by a truck. Their feelings develop for each other but her co-worker turns out to like her as well. She does not like him so the latter turns to the darker side of the law, by conspiring with the rival Axe Gang. Unfortunately for him, the mafia son has more than a few tricks up his sleeve and gets support from his dim-witted brothers and henchman.

Cast
 Shin Hyun-Joon as Jang In-jae
 Kim Won-hee as Kim Jin-kyung/Jin-sook
 Kim Soo-mi as Hong Duk-ja
 Gong Hyung-jin as Prosecutor Bong
 Im Hyung-joon as Jang Kyung-jae
 Tak Jae-hoon as Jang Suk-jae
 Shin Yi as Soon-Nam
 Jeong Jun-ha - Jong-Myeon
 Kim Hae-gon - Yoon Do-sik
 Jung Joon-ho - Dae-Seo
 Kim Tae-hwan - Hammer
 Baek Il-seob - Jin-kyung's father

Release
The film was released on DVD in South Korea and Vietnam.

See also
 Marrying the Mafia
 Marrying the Mafia III
 Marrying the Mafia IV

References

External links
 
 
 

2000s crime comedy films
Films about organized crime in South Korea
Films directed by Jeong Yong-ki
2000s Korean-language films
Showbox films
South Korean crime comedy films
South Korean sequel films
2000s South Korean films